David James Ritchie (October 6, 1950 - September 6, 2009) was a game designer and author.

Early life and education
David Ritchie was a native of Canton, Ohio. He was a graduate of Lehman High School in Canton and attended Grove City College in Pennsylvania where he met his wife, Deborah.

Career
David Ritchie was working for Simulations Publications, Inc. (SPI) when it was taken over by TSR in March 1982. In the following months, as SPI employees either quit or were fired, Ritchie became the final holdover from SPI. He designed The Omega War in his final months at SPI, before leaving in late 1983 to work for Coleco. Ritchie, along with Jon Pickens, David "Zeb" Cook, Harold Johnson, Rick Swan, and Ed Carmien, co-wrote the adventure module OA2 Night of the Seven Swords. Ritchie and Dave Arneson detailed Arneson's world of Blackmoor in a series of four adventure books from TSR, DA1: Adventures in Blackmoor (1986), DA2: Temple of the Frog (1986), DA3: City of the Gods (1987) and DA4: The Duchy of Ten (1987).

Ritchie wrote the 1991 book Connecticut: Off the Beaten Path with his wife, Deborah.

Ritchie died in his Connecticut home on September 6, 2009, at the age of 58.

References

External links
 

1950 births
2009 deaths
Board game designers
Dungeons & Dragons game designers
Grove City College alumni
Writers from Canton, Ohio